C-jun-amino-terminal kinase-interacting protein 1 is an enzyme that in humans is encoded by the MAPK8IP1 gene.

The protein encoded by this gene is a regulator of the pancreatic beta-cell function. It is highly similar to JIP-1, a mouse protein known to be a regulator of c-Jun  amino-terminal kinase (Mapk8). This protein has been shown to prevent MAPK8 mediated activation of transcription factors, and decrease IL-1 beta and MAP kinase kinase 1 (MEKK1) induced apoptosis in pancreatic beta cells. This protein also functions as a DNA-binding transactivator of the glucose transporter GLUT2. RE1-silencing transcription factor (REST) is reported to repress the expression of this gene in insulin-secreting beta cells. This gene is found to be mutated in a type 2 diabetes family, and thus is thought to be a susceptibility gene for type 2 diabetes.

Interactions
MAPK8IP1 has been shown to interact with MAP3K10, DUSP16, Mitogen-activated protein kinase 9, MAPK8, LRP2, LRP1, MAP3K12, MAP2K7, MAPK8IP2 and MAP3K11.

References

Further reading